Dorothy Yeats (born 29 July 1993) is a Canadian wrestler and Commonwealth Games champion. She won gold at the 2014 Commonwealth Games. She also wrestled at Vanier College in Montreal, where she is on the school's Wall of Fame. She once said about Vanier College, "I never even considered going anywhere else. I’m glad I came here. I don’t think I could have excelled at my sport anywhere else."

Daughter of five-time Olympian Doug Yeats, who won gold at the 1979 Pan American Games, Dorothy participated at the 2010 Summer Youth Olympics in Singapore. She won the gold medal in the girls' freestyle 70 kg event, defeating Jinju Moon of South Korea in the final. In 2012, she faced Adeline Gray of USA in the gold medal match at the world championship. Although she was defeated, the 19-year-old walked away with a silver medal. She in also the 2012 and 2013 Junior World Champion at 67 kg.

In July 2016, she was officially named to Canada's 2016 Olympic team.

Championships 
 9X Canadian National Champion (60 kg–69 kg)
 2009 Canada Games Champion at 65 kg
 2010 Junior Pan American Champion & Cadet Pan American Champion at 63 kg
 2010 Youth Olympic Games Champion at 70 kg
 2011 Commonwealth Champion at 63 kg
 2012 Junior World Champion
 2012 Senior World Silver Medalist
 2013 Junior World Champion
 2014 Commonwealth Games Champion
 2014 University World Champion
 2015 Pan American Games Champion (69 kg)

References

External links
 

Wrestlers at the 2010 Summer Youth Olympics
Canadian female sport wrestlers
Living people
Sportspeople from Montreal
Anglophone Quebec people
Wrestlers at the 2014 Commonwealth Games
Commonwealth Games gold medallists for Canada
Wrestlers at the 2015 Pan American Games
1993 births
World Wrestling Championships medalists
Pan American Games gold medalists for Canada
Wrestlers at the 2016 Summer Olympics
Olympic wrestlers of Canada
Commonwealth Games medallists in wrestling
Pan American Games medalists in wrestling
Youth Olympic gold medalists for Canada
Medalists at the 2015 Pan American Games
Medallists at the 2014 Commonwealth Games